The 1670s decade ran from January 1, 1670, to December 31, 1679.

References